Goz Beïda is the main town of the Kimiti department and the Sila region of southeastern Chad.

Goz Beida may also refer to:
Goz Beida, Central African Republic
Goz Beïda Airport (ICAO: FTTG), Chad
Goz Beïda National Park, Chad